Prairie Township is an inactive township in Pettis County, in the U.S. state of Missouri.

Prairie Township was erected in 1873, and named for the prairie within its borders.

References

Townships in Missouri
Townships in Pettis County, Missouri